Zharko Basheski (born 11 August 1957) is a Macedonian sculptor and professor in the Sculpture Department at the Faculty of Fine Arts in Skopje. His work falls under the hyperrealism movement, with a specific focus on the human body.

Life and work
Basheski was born on 11 August 1957 in Prilep, Republic of Macedonia, then part of SFR Yugoslavia. In 1988, he graduated at the Faculty of Fine Arts in Skopje in the class of Petar Hadzi Boskov. Ten years later, in 1998, he acquired his MFA degree at the same institution in the class of Dragan Popovski - Dada. He is member of DLUM (Macedonian Artists Association) since 1988. From 1999 to 2009 he was head of Department of Sculpture at the Faculty of Fine Arts. His work has been presented at several international exhibitions and he has been the recipient of numerous awards. Much of his work is in private collections in the Republic of Macedonia and in foreign countries. Currently he is a member of the National Board for Accreditation and Evaluation, the Senate of the Ss. Cyril and Methodius University of Skopje and the Inter-University conference.

The interest in his work is turned towards the human, hence the interest in hyperrealistic approach in shaping the concept of the work, which in the theoretical projection exceeds hyperrealism, talks about life and the world in which we live. In his work there are several elements which are new to the world of sculpture and that make his latest work different: the concept, contemporary views of human condition through self-observation, technical production and use of new materials (resin polyester, polymarble, silicone, natural hair), the hyper-realistic treatment, size of the work, the philosophical approach – all of which, when combined in one, offer a multilayered reading of the artwork.

Solo exhibitions
 2018 "Asphyxia" Cultural Institution Delavski dom Trbovlje, Slovenia
 2018 "Asphyxia", Multimedia Centre Kibla, Maribor, Skopje, Macedonia
 2017 "Asphyxia", Nano Bar, "Museum Debar Maalo", Skopje, Macedonia
 2017 Maribor, Slovenia at KIBLA PORTAL
 2016 Skopje, National Gallery, Ordinary Human
 2015 Paris, at Gallery Helene Nougaro, "Adam And Eve – Eternal Resumption"
 2014 Cetinje, at Gallery of Art of Montenegro "Miodrag Dado Đurić exhibition "Behind the Look"
 2014 Sofia, at Gallery Paris Moscow, exhibition Transformation
 2013 Nuremberg, at Bunsen Goetz Galerie
 2012 Paris, at Cité internationale des arts exhibition "Behind the Look"
 2011 Venice Biennale, exhibition Leap
 2010 Ohrid, Centre of Culture " Grigor Prlicev "
 2010 Prilep, Art Gallery – Culture Center " Marko Cepenkov "
 2010 Skopje, Culture and Information Center
 2010 New York City, Galleru MC
 2004 Skopje, Sculptures, Museum of the City of Skopje
 1998 Skopje Sculpture-Temple Hram, Museum of Contemporary Art-Skopje
 1997 Skopje, Art Gallery – Daut Pasha Amam – Skopje
 1994 Skopje, Culture and Information Center
 1993 Bitola, Art Gallery
 1993 Prilep, Art Gallery – Culture Center "Marko Cepenkov"
 1984 Prilep, Art Gallery – Culture Center "Marko Cepenkov"

Group exhibition (selection)
 2018 "50 years of Hyperrealistic Sculpture", Kunsthale, Rotterdam, Netherlands
 2017 National Gallery of Australia, Canberra, Australia "50 years of Hyper realistic Sculpture"
 2017 Ferenczy Muzeumi Centrum, Budapest, Hungary "MIG 21"
 2017 KIC, Skopje, Macedonia "Femine/II"
 2017 Copenhagen, Arken Museum, GOSH! IS IT ALIVE?
 2016 Monterei Mexico, Museo de arte contemporaneo "50 years of Hyper realistic Sculpture"
 2016 Bilbao Spain, Museo de Bellas Artes de Bilbao, "50 years of Hyper realistic Sculpture"
 2015 Dox, Prague, "Brave New World"
 2015 Riga, Latvia, "My Heart Is A Tiger"
 2014 Skopje, National Gallery of Macedonia, "Paris je t'aime"
 2012 "Malta Arts Festival 2012"
 2011 35th Anniversary of Museum of Contemporary Art of Macedonia
 2008 Skopje, Refresh Yourself, Macedonia Square, Museum of the City of Skopje
 2008 Bari(Italy), Presentation of the Macedonian Culture
 2005 New York (USA), Gallery MC
 2004 Skopje, Exhibition from the Collection of the City Assembly Skopje
 Skopje, DLUM Annual Exhibition
 2003 Skopje, Portrait, DLUM
 1998 Skopje, Winter Salon, Art Gallery
 1997 Skopje, Winter Salon, Art Gallery
 Skopje, HARFA Gallery
 1996 Skopje, Installation, Chifte Amam
 Skopje, House of ARM
 G. Milanovac (SCG), IV International Biennail of Miniature Art
 Skopje, Winter Salon, Art Gallery
 1995 Istanbul, (Turkey)
 Fayetteville, Arkansas (USA)
 Skopje, Exhibition from the Fine Arts Colony in Prilep, KIC
 1994 Skopje, Winter Salon, Art Gallery
 1993 Skopje, Drawings, DLUM Annual Exhibition
 Skopje Exhibition of 14 professors from the Faculty of Fine Arts, ANIMA Gallery
 Tempi, Arizona (USA), Drawings, Weatherspoon Art Gallery
 Skopje, Small Plastic, Art Gallery
 Skopje, Drowings – Biennail, National Library Kliment Ohridski
 Skopje, Winter Salon, Art Gallery
 1992 Skopje, Winter Salon, Art Gallery
 1991 Skopje, Small Plastic, Art Gallery
 1990 Skopje, 10th Anniversary since the voundation of the Faculty of Fine Arts, ANIMA Gallery
 1989 Skopje, II Youth Biennail, Museum of Contemporary Art-Skopje
 Skopje, DLUM Annual Exhibition
 1988 Skopje Graduated students from the FFA
 Skopje, DLUM Annual Exhibition
 1984 Skopje, Happening, Youth Center

Public performances – sculptures and monuments
 2017 ASPHYXIA, hyperrealism, Skopje, Macedonia
 2017 Ordinary Man, bronze, Tübingen, Germany
 2016 Metodija Satorov Sarlo, bronze, Prilep
 2014 Horseman monument of General Apostolski
 2012 Kuzman Josifofski Pity, bronze, Prilep
 2012 Gjorce Petrov, bronze, Prilep
 2010 Horseman monument of Dame Gruev, bronze, Macedonia Square, Skopje
 2010 Horseman monument of Goce Delcev, bronze, Macedonia Square, Skopje
 2010 Monument of St. Cyril and Methodius. bronze, The Stone Bridge, Skopje
 2008 Itar Pejo, bronze, Prilep
 2007 Monuments of the "Defenders of Macedonia", marble, Skopje
 2006 "Broken Wing", bronze and granite, Skopje
 2005 " Alexander the Great ", bronze, Prilep
 2004 "Phoenix", steel, Bul. Macedonia, Skopje
 1999 "Sculpture-Temple" – the Dome, processed brick, stone, metal – the plateau on Str. Kliment Ohridski, Skopje
 1998 Iconostasis in the church St. Leontie in Vodocha, Strumica
 A portrait of Dimitar Makedonski, marble, the school yard of the Elementary School "Dimitar Makedonski", Skopje
 Part of the project "Sculpture-Temple", stone, the plateau in front of the Museum of Contemporary Art-Skopje

Awards
 2016 Sv. Kliment Ohridski
 2015 Metodija Satorov Sarlo, first prize
 2012 Kuzman Josifofski Pity, Public Competition of the City of Skopje, First Prize
 2011 I Award Macedonian National Theater, Sculptures of Petre Prlicko, Meri Boskova and Todorce Nikolovski
 2011 "13 November 2011" Award of Merit for the City of Prilep
 2011 Part of Kuzman Josifovski Pitu, Public Competition of the City of Prilep, First Prize
 2011 Gjorce Petrov Public Competition of the City of Prilep, First Prize
 2010 I Award, Three Muses, colonnade Center of Skopje
 2008 II Interpretative Award on the Competition for Monument of St. Cyril and Methodius, Skopje
 2008 III Award on the International Competition for horseman, Philip II Skopje
 2008 I Interpretative Award on the International Competition for Horseman sculptures of Goce Delcev and Dame Gruev, Macedonia Square, Skopje
 2008 III Award, Water fountain with Sculpture of Philip II, Skopje
 2007 III Award on the international Competition for horseman sculpture and water fountain of Alexander the Great, Skopje
 2004 DLUM Annual Award "Nerezi Masters", Museum of the City of Skopje
 1998 DLUM Annual Award "Nerezi Masters", Art Gallery, Skopje
 1993 DLUM Annual Award "Small Plastic", Art Gallery, Skopje

References

External links
 Official website
 Project LEAP, 54th International Art Exhibition – La Biennale di Venezia
 Saatchi
 Sculptsite profile
 Wizz 

Hyperrealist artists
Macedonian contemporary artists
Macedonian sculptors
1957 births
Living people